The Theory and Practice of Oligarchical Collectivism is a fictional book in George Orwell's dystopian novel Nineteen Eighty-Four (1949). The book was supposedly written by Emmanuel Goldstein, the principal enemy of the state of Oceania's ruling party. The Party portrays Goldstein as a former member of the Inner Party who continually conspired to depose Big Brother and overthrow the government. In the novel, the book is read by the protagonist, Winston Smith who recalls that "There were ... whispered stories of a terrible book, a compendium of all the heresies, of which Goldstein was the author, and which circulated clandestinely here and there. It was a book without a title. People referred to it, if at all, simply as The Book."

Background 

In Nineteen Eighty-Four, the protagonist Winston Smith writes a diary in which he confesses thought crimes, such as his secret hatred of Big Brother and the Party. In the course of his work life at the Ministry of Truth, Winston approaches O'Brien, a member of the Inner Party, believing him part of the Brotherhood, Goldstein's conspiracy against Oceania. Initially, O'Brien appears as such, especially in arranging to give Winston a copy of The Book, the possession of which is a crime in Oceania. In conversation, O'Brien tells Winston that The Book reveals the true, totalitarian nature of the dystopian society that the Party established in Oceania, and that full membership to the Brotherhood requires reading The Book. Winston describes his first encounter with The Book:

The term Oligarchical Collectivism refers to Ingsoc, the dominant ideology of Oceania, and to the ideologies of Neo-Bolshevism in Eurasia and Death-worship (Obliteration of the Self) in Eastasia. Winston reads two long excerpts establishing how the three totalitarian super-states – Eastasia, Eurasia, Oceania – emerged from a global war, thus connecting the past to his present, the year 1984, and explains the basic political philosophy of the totalitarianism that derived from the authoritarian political tendencies manifested in the twentieth century. That the three, ostensibly opposing ideologies are functionally identical is the central revelation of The Book.

Theoretically, Oligarchical Collectivism recalls the theory of bureaucratic collectivism put forth by some Trotskyists in the late 1930s as a description of the Soviet Union under Stalin. Oceania's principal enemy of the people, Emmanuel Goldstein, is modelled after Leon Trotsky, a former member of the inner circle of the Bolshevik Party whom Stalin purged and then declared an enemy of the people of the Soviet Union, the socialist state that Trotsky had helped found in Russia. From exile, Trotsky criticised the social system of the Soviet Union.

Contents 
"Chapter I: Ignorance is Strength", and "Chapter III: War is Peace" of The Book are titled with Party slogans; O'Brien later refers to chapters featuring a programme for deposing the Party. (Chapter II, presumably titled "Freedom is Slavery" after the remaining Party slogan, is not detailed in the novel.)

Chapter I 
"Ignorance is Strength" details the perpetual class struggle characteristic of human societies; beginning with the historical observation that societies always have hierarchically divided themselves into social classes and castes: the High (who rule); the Middle (who work for, and yearn to supplant the High), and the Low (whose goal is daily survival). Cyclically, the Middle deposed the High, by enlisting the Low. Upon assuming power, however, the Middle (the new High class) recast the Low into their usual servitude. In the event, the classes perpetually repeat the cycle, when the Middle class speaks to the Low class of "justice" and of "human brotherhood" in aid of becoming the High class rulers.

Ian Slater writes that Goldstein goes beyond George Orwell's beliefs in earlier work, such as A Clergyman's Daughter, in which the Middle makes a pretence of believing in equality. In Animal Farm, the state sought power to improve society, but once technological advances make equality possible, the Middle abandons their former promises, as socialism only stands in the way of their aims; they become explicitly tyrannical and openly hostile to equality. The new rhetoric of the Middle becomes Ingsoc and hierarchical collectivism. This pursuit of naked power, without any pretense of concern for equality, distinguishes the Party from previous tyrannies, though the Party initially justifies its control through dedication to socialism. By focusing on collectivism, the Party can consolidate their power and present Ingsoc as an inevitable followup to capitalism in which the Low are no longer exploited. In reality, the social castes are no longer necessary, and collectivism only serves to prolong the exploitation of the Low. Slater states that while O'Brien does not own his mansion, he still lives in luxury compared to the lower castes. Once the Party consolidates its power, all justifications are abandoned. The Party itself is a meritocracy, not hereditary. This is not rooted in egalitarianism but practicality, as the Party realizes that its continuation depends on purity of orthodoxy, rather than a bloodline.

Unlike Orwell's prior writing, the Party's exploitation in this case is fully intentional.  Slater writes that Orwell desired to show through the Party's unrealistic politics that modern authoritarianism was growing more lustful of power for power's sake. Orwell believed that modern states could bring about the desires of the Spanish Inquisition not only to control men but also to control their thoughts.  This could be achieved through technological breakthroughs, such as the telescreen, a two-way television that allows continuous government surveillance of the population. Efficient use of such technology to control the populace requires centralisation, and the four ministries of Oceania – the Ministries of Truth, Peace, Love, and Plenty – fill this need.

The Proles usually are not subject to propaganda. Instead, it is the middle class – the Outer Party – that the Inner Party fears.  Because the Proles have lost everything and have nothing, they have no future. The Party, through the Ministry of Truth, practices historical revisionism, which robs the Proles of a past, too. Robbed of the ability to learn from history and the worries of the future, the Proles exist in a state of constant present and are incapable of revolution. In order to prevent any unorthodoxy, the Ministry of Truth uses Newspeak, an impoverished language that makes heresy impossible by omitting words that could express it. Newspeak also reduces thought to simple opposites, such as good and "ungood", an intentional dichotomy that hides nuance and ambiguity while promoting black and white thinking. Party members are further subject to self-deceptive habits of mind, such as crimestop ("preventive stupidity"), which halts thinking at the threshold of politically dangerous thought, and doublethink, which allows simultaneously holding and believing contradictory thoughts without noticing the contradiction, to wit:

Chapter III 
Before reading the first chapter, Winston reads the third chapter "War is Peace", which explains that slogan-title's meaning, by reviewing how the global super-states were established: The United States merged with the British Empire (and later Latin America) to form Oceania; the Soviets absorbed mainland Europe to form Eurasia; and Eastasia emerged "after a decade of confused fighting", with China proper's annexation of Japan, Korea and parts of Mongolia and Tibet. In various alliances, they have warred for twenty-five years. Yet the perpetual war is militarily nonsensical, because "it is a warfare of limited aims between combatants who are unable to destroy one another, have no material cause for fighting and are not divided by any genuine ideological difference", since each is a totalitarian state.

Scientific advance is held carefully in check, as the Party does not want to allow for any unaccounted abundance of goods, which could conceivably raise the quality of life beyond bare subsistence for the Proles. The only technological advances permitted are in mind control and genocide, the twin goals of each of the superstates. Once mind control is perfected, the superstates are free to destroy their counterparts in a theoretical single, decisive strike that precludes retaliation. Technological advancement, even in war, can be counterproductive to the goals of the Party; none of the superstates are a true threat to each other, as they all must exist in a state of permanent limited war to survive. By harnessing the hysteria of war and demand for self-sacrifice, each of the nations declare war not on each other but on their own populace, who are kept ignorant, on the brink of starvation, and overworked. Permanent limited war also allows for the Party to divert attention away from domestic concerns and their failures. Instead of promises of an "easy, safe life", Slater writes that Orwell believed that the populace requires heroic nationalism. Thus, war becomes a psychological tool to establish a kind of ironic "peace", a stasis where progress is impossible and nothing ever changes, except for the possibility of eventual global conquest. However, even though Inner Party members have devoted their lives to establishing Oceania as the universal world power, they use doublethink also in connection with the war, knowing that it is necessary for the conflict to go on indefinitely to keep the structure of Oceanic society intact.

Later chapters 
Winston never has the opportunity to finish reading The Theory and Practice of Oligarchical Collectivism, and learn the "Whys?" of Oceania and the world order in 1984 before the Thought Police arrest him, yet he believes that the hope of change lies with the Proles. The question of 'Why?' is later revealed to him by O'Brien during the torture: power is an end in itself.

"Always we shall have the heretic here
at our mercy, screaming with pain, broken up, contemptible--and in the end
utterly penitent, saved from himself, crawling to our feet of his own
accord. That is the world that we are preparing, Winston. A world of
victory after victory, triumph after triumph after triumph: an endless
pressing, pressing, pressing upon the nerve of power."

Authorship 
O'Brien rejects as nonsense Winston Smith's perspective that Big Brother and the Party can be overthrown, because he is a member of the Inner Party, and not a revolutionary of the Brotherhood. At the Miniluv, O'Brien tortures Winston to cure him of his political insanity: the belief that there exists an objective reality that is external to the reality of the Party. In their torture chamber conversations, he tells Winston that The Book was written by a committee that included himself. When Winston asks O'Brien if The Book is true, he replies: "As description, yes. The programme it sets forth is nonsense."

Significance
Eric Cheyfitz noted that "whatever the function of [this book] is within the plot of the novel, Orwell uses its extensive elaboration in the novel to make political points about the present of 1949 and the future he imagines unfolding from this present."

The book has been described as a parody and critique of The Revolution Betrayed: What Is the Soviet Union and Where Is It Going? (1937), by Leon Trotsky; and The Managerial Revolution (1941), by James Burnham, a former Trotskyist.

References 

Fictional elements introduced in 1949
Nineteen Eighty-Four
Fictional books
Philosophical literature
Pseudepigraphy
Books about Trotskyism